Slangsvold is a settlement and a 5 km-long valley located in the north-eastern part of the municipality of Råde in Norway. Slangsvold has about 100 inhabitants. The principal industry of Slangsvold is farming; other industries are a bus company, a quarry, a concrete mixing plant, and two ground work construction companies.

Villages in Østfold